Bajrang Bahadur Singh (born 1 July 1971) is an Indian politician and a member of 15th, 16th and 17th Legislative Assembly of Uttar Pradesh. He represents the Pharenda (Assembly constituency) in Maharajganj district of Uttar Pradesh and is a member of the Bharatiya Janata Party.

Early life and education
Singh was born 1 July 1971 in the Marhatha village in Campierganj tehsil of Gorakhpur district of Uttar Pradesh to father late Parmeshwar Singh. He graduated in Political science and Prachin Historical Sainya Science from Deen Dayal Upadhyay Gorakhpur University in 1991. On 3 May 1992, he married Punita Singh, with whom he has a son and three daughters.

He is also owner of Parmeshwar Singh Memorial Postgraduate College and Parmeshwar Singh Memorial Public School in Mathura Nagar, Maharajganj.

Political career
Singh has been MLA for three strength term. He started his political journey in 15th Legislative Assembly of Uttar Pradesh (2007) elections, he got ticket by Bharatiya Janata Party from Pharenda (Assembly constituency) and was elected MLA by defeating Bahujan Samaj Party candidate Virendra Chaudhary by a margin of 8,914 votes.

In 16th Legislative Assembly of Uttar Pradesh (2012) elections, he was again elected MLA from Pharenda by defeating Indian National Congress candidate Virendra Chaudhary by a margin of 13,335 votes.

In October, a complaint was lodged to the Lokayukta against BJP MLA Bajrang Bahadur Singh from Pharenda seat of Maharajganj district, that he was doing government contract. Lokayukta Justice NK Mehrotra, in the investigation, found the charges against Singh to be correct and recommended the government dismiss his assembly membership. The recommendation of the Lokayukta was sent by the government to the Governor. The governor referred the matter to the Election Commission. The Election Commission conducted a hearing on the matter and found that under Article 191 of the Constitution, no MLA can hold the post of profit under the Center or any State Government. While Singh was also getting salary from the government as MLA and was also making profit from government contracting. In such a situation, the Election Commission recommended the Governor suspend him. In March 2015, Governor Ram Naik cancelled his assembly membership.

In 17th Legislative Assembly of Uttar Pradesh (2017) elections, he again contested from Pharenda on BJP's ticket and he was elected MLA for third time continuously by defeating Indian National Congress candidate Virendra Chaudhary by a margin of 2,354 votes.

Posts held

References

Uttar Pradesh MLAs 2017–2022
Uttar Pradesh MLAs 2012–2017
Uttar Pradesh MLAs 2007–2012
Bharatiya Janata Party politicians from Uttar Pradesh
Living people
People from Gorakhpur district
1971 births